Mathukutty Xavier is an Indian film Director and Screenplay Writer who predominantly works in Malayalam Cinema. He has won the 67th National Award for Best Debut Film of a Director. His first film was Helen. The film is remade into Hindi titled as Mili directed by himself, with Janhvi Kapoor in the titular role.

Filmography

Awards
 67th National Award - Indira Gandhi Award for Best Debut Film of a Director

References

Year of birth missing (living people)
Living people
Malayalam film directors
Indian male screenwriters
Malayalam screenwriters